Papyrus Oxyrhynchus 35 (P. Oxy. 35) is a proclamation and list of emperors by an unknown author.  It is written in the Greek language. The papyrus was discovered by Grenfell and Hunt in 1897 in Oxyrhynchus, and is dated to the year 223. The text was published by Grenfell and Hunt in 1898.

The list is generally accurate. It enumerates the Roman emperors along with the number of years each ruled, from Augustus to Decius. Galba is omitted.

The manuscript was written on papyrus in the form of a sheet. The measurements of the fragment are 138 by 134 mm. The text is written in medium-sized cursive letters.

See also 
 Oxyrhynchus Papyri
 Papyrus Oxyrhynchus 34
 Papyrus Oxyrhynchus 36

References 

035
3rd-century manuscripts